Taurongia is a genus of Australian intertidal spiders that was first described by Henry Roughton Hogg in 1901.  it contains only two species: T. ambigua and T. punctata. Originally placed with the Amaurobiidae, it was moved to the intertidal spiders in 1967.

References

Araneomorphae genera
Desidae
Spiders of Australia